Ebsdorfergrund is a municipality consisting of eleven villages in the southeast of Marburg-Biedenkopf district in Hesse, Germany.

The community's municipal area extends over the Ebsdorfer Grund in the valley of the Zwester Ohm and the areas around its edges, connecting the Amöneburg Basin with the middle Lahn valley between Marburg and Gießen.

Through the municipal area runs a highway from Fronhausen (Autobahn interchange in Gießen by Bundesstraße B 3) to Kirchhain. Another one joins Marburg with Grünberg.

The old ring railway, the Marburger Kreisbahn, which opened in 1905 and ran through the municipal area to Dreihausen, was shut down in 1972.

Neighbouring communities
In the northwest, Ebsdorfergrund borders on the town of Marburg, in the north on the town of Kirchhain, in the northeast on the town of Amöneburg (all in Marburg-Biedenkopf) and the town of Homberg (Vogelsbergkreis), in the south on the community of Rabenau and the town of Allendorf, in the southwest on the town of Staufenberg (all three in Gießen district), and in the west on the communities of Fronhausen and Weimar (both in Marburg-Biedenkopf).

Centres
The community consists of the following centres (Ortsteile):
Beltershausen
Dreihausen (Basalt quarry)
Ebsdorf
Hachborn
Heskem-Mölln
Ilschhausen
Leidenhofen 	
Rauischholzhausen (Schloss Rauischholzhausen stately home with Schlosspark owned by University of Giessen)
Roßberg
Wermertshausen
Wittelsberg

Politics

Municipal council

As of municipal elections held on 26 March 2006, seats on the municipal council are apportioned thus:

Coat of arms
The community's municipal coat of arms might be described as: Or, on a three-knolled hill vert a crenellated tower gules, therein the Hessian shield.

The coat of arms recalls the Wittelsberg Schanze, who served the Hessian Landgraves by watching over traffic on the road running through the Ebsdorfer Grund between areas belonging to the Ecclesiastical Principality of Mainz.

Partnerships
The community of Ebsdorfergrund maintains partnerships with the following municipalities:
 Bidford-on-Avon, United Kingdom since 1980
 Liniewo, Poland since 1998

Important personalities
 Dr. Friederike Damm, bearer of the Bundesverdienstkreuz am Bande (bestowed 2 December 2005)

References

External links
 Community's official website
 Ebsdorf website
  – Further links

Marburg-Biedenkopf